CCTV-4 is a Chinese free-to-air television channel. It is one of six China Central Television channels that broadcasts outside the People's Republic of China.

This channel contains a variety of programs including documentaries, music, news, drama series, sports and children shows for Greater China including China, Hong Kong, Macau and Taiwan.

History
CCTV-4 was officially launched on 1 October 1992 with broadcasts from 8:30 am to 12:10 am Beijing Time.

The programming of CCTV-4 initially consisted of a mixture of English- and Chinese-language programming. English broadcasts stopped with the launch of CCTV-9 in September 2000. Select CCTV-4 programs were also broadcast in Cantonese until 2007.

On 1 November 1994, CCTV News was replaced by "China News".

On 1 July 1995, the channel expanded and extended its international coverage by launching on satellite. At the same time, the channel was revised and programs were broadcast in Mandarin, Cantonese and English, and started airing 24 hours a day.

On 1 January 2007, the channel was split into three editions of continents and three editions of countries:
 CCTV-4 Asia.
 CCTV-4 Europe.
 CCTV-4 America.

In 2016 Peter Dahlin's forced confessions were aired on CCTV-4. In 2019 Dahlin filed a complaint against China Central Television-4 (CCTV-4) with Canadian authorities.

Programmes 
 CCTV New Year's Gala
 China's Public Opinion Field
 Across China
 Traditional Chinese Medicine
 Our Chinese Heart
 China Showbiz
 China News
 Xinwen Lianbo
 Journey to Civilization
 Foreigner in China
 Tian Ya Gong Ci Shi
 Sports on Line
 Happy Chinese
 Asia Today
 Focus Today
 Chinese World
 Beloved Family

References

China Central Television channels
Television channels and stations established in 1992
1992 establishments in China